The Biggest Loser UK 2009 was the third season of the reality television series The Biggest Loser. The season first aired on 27 April 2009 with the final episode on 19 June 2009 with eight overweight couples (sixteen individuals) competing for a cash prize of £10,000. Kate Garraway was featured as the host, with trainers Angie Dowds and Richard Callender. Kevin Sage was named as the winner after losing .

Contestants

Total Votes counts only votes that are revealed at elimination. The total doesn't count unrevealed votes.

Weigh-Ins
Contestants are listed in chronological order of elimination.

Winners
 £10,000 Winner (among the finalists)
Standings
 Week's Biggest Loser
 Week's Biggest Loser & Immunity
 Immunity (Challenge or Weigh-In)
 Highest Percentage Weight Loss (Non-finalist)

Weigh-Ins Figures History

Elimination Voting History

  Won immunity (Challenge or Weigh-in).
  Below yellow line, not allowed to vote.
  Not in elimination, not allowed to vote.
  Vote not revealed because a majority had already been reached.
  Withdrew before vote took place.
  Eliminated or not in house.
  Eliminated due to lowest percentage weight loss

Notes
The votes in week 8 where a vote for the last place in the final 4. As there was a tie, Kevin had the deciding vote and he chose to take Sadie to the 4th finalist.

References

External links

"Article from Hull and East Riding at Hull and East Riding Article about the new show

2009 British television seasons
UK